Shout to the Lord 2000 is a live praise and worship album of contemporary worship music by Hillsong. The album appeared on the Billboard 200 and reached No. 8 on the Top Contemporary Christian Albums Chart.

Making of the album
Shout to the Lord 2000 was recorded live at the 1998 Hillsong Conference by Darlene Zschech and the Hillsong team. Ron Kenoly and Alvin Slaughter also appear on this album. It was recorded at the State Sports Centre as well.

Track listing
 "Can't Stop Talking" (Russell Fragar) 
 "Friends in High Places" (Fragar) 
 "God Is in the House" (Fragar & Darlene Zschech) 
 "All Things Are Possible" (Zschech) 
 "Jesus Is Alive" (Ron Kenoly) 
 "Breathe on Me" (Lucy Fisher) 
 "My Heart Will Trust" (Reuben Morgan) 
 "The Potter's Hand" (Zschech) 
 "Love You So Much" (Fragar) 
 "That's What We Came Here For" (Fragar & Zschech) 
 "My Redeemer Lives" (Morgan) 
 "God Is Good" (Alvin Slaughter) 
 "Shout to the Lord" (Zschech) 
 "Glory to the King" (Zschech) 
 "Eagle's Wings" (Morgan) 
 "Hear Our Praises" (Morgan)

Credits 

 David Moyse – guitar, engineer
 Jeff Todd – engineer, post production engineer
 Darlene Zschech – arranger, producer, worship leader, vocal director
 Chris Springer – A&R
 Mark Stevens – vocals
 David Riley – design
 Reuben Morgan – acoustic guitar
 Megan Parker – saxophone
 Russell Fragar – piano, engineer, post production engineer, producer, arranger
 Cameron Wade – director, technical director
 Matt Damico – mixing assistant
 Ross Peacock –drums
 Chris Miline – percussion
 Peter King – timpani
 Rick Peteriet – drums
 Bart Elsmore – engineer, post production engineer
 Greg Hughes – trombone
 Mark Gregory – trumpet
 Lisa Young- vocals
 Donia Gandjou – vocals
 Nick Asha – engineer
 Trevor Beck – engineer, post production engineer, assistant engineer
 Erica Crocker – vocals
 Lucy Fisher – vocals
 Craig Gower – keyboards, vocals
 Scott Haslem – vocals, vocal director
 Michael Cuthbertson – director, technical director
 Ruth Grant – choir director
 Hills Christian Life centre choir – choir, chorus
 Karen Parker -saxophone
 Chris Thomason – executive producer
 Don Moen – executive producer
 Ron Davis – engineer, mixing
 Alvin Slaughter – vocals, performer
 Matt Barnes – engineer
 Ron Kenoly – leader, performer

References 

1998 live albums
Hillsong Music live albums